Anderson Marsh State Historic Park is a California State Historic Park and nature reserve preserving a tule marsh, archaeological sites of the Pomo people, and historic ranch structures. It is located in Lake County, California, United States.  Anderson Marsh is located at the head of Cache Creek on the southeast corner of Clear Lake, the largest natural lake completely within the borders of California. The park is between the cities of Lower Lake and Clearlake on State Route 53, north of Calistoga in the wine country. The park is open year-round.

Natural history
The Anderson Marsh Park contains  of native bunch grass-covered hills, oak woodland, and Tule (Schoenoplectus acutus) marshes. It protects several habitats including: freshwater marsh wetlands, native grasslands, California oak woodlands, and riparian woodlands. Aquatic and terrestrial wildlife include: large mouth bass, bluegill, catfish, crappie, the north-western pond turtle, bats, gray fox, frogs, garter snakes, mink, muskrats, opossums, raccoon, river otter, skunks, and toads.

Approximately 151 different bird species, both migrating and resident, have been identified in the park.

History
The Southeastern Pomo Native Americans, one of the largest groups of indigenous peoples of the Americas in pre-Columbian California, lived in the area of present-day Anderson Marsh State Historic Park, and their descendants continue to do so nearby.  Anderson Marsh's archaeological sites provide artifacts of the Pomo people. Some sites are among the oldest found in California, dated at over 10,000 years old. After recording 43 prehistoric sites, John Parker nominated the area to the National Register of Historic Places and began a campaign to have the sites acquired as a new State Park.

John Grigsby homesteaded in 1854 with his family, and built a small house. Scotsman John Still Anderson, with his wife and six children, bought the property from Grigsby in 1884, built what is now known as the Ranch House, and ran a dairy and raised beef cattle. Their descendants lived in the Ranch House until the 1960s.

The State Historic Park was named after John Still Anderson in 1982 after the State of California acquired the Anderson Marsh.

Visitor attractions

Activities

The park offers bird watching, hiking, a bluegrass musical festival, and interpretive programs, including a historic ranch home.

Anderson Marsh Interpretive Association - AMIA
The Anderson Marsh Interpretive Association (AMIA) was formed in 1984 by park staff and other volunteers. The primary objective of the association is to promote the education and interpretive activities of the park. AMIA also funds projects including: habitat conservation and restoration work, trail accessibility construction and maintenance, interpretive displays and written information, facilities, historical objects rehabilitation, and acquiring interpretive items.

Closure proposal
Anderson Marsh State Historic Park is one of 70 California state parks scheduled to close in 2012 by California Governor Jerry Brown. The park will close July 2012 to achieve part of the $11 million budget reduction for the 2011/2012 fiscal year. This park and 47 other state parks were previously slated for closure in 2008 for financial reasons, but was saved from closure.

See also
Post Pattern - Paleo-Indian archaeological culture
List of Museums in the North Coast (California)

References

Books 
Anderson, John Still, & Dickson, J. D. (1878). Decisions in the Court of Session from 1800 to 1878 in cases concerned with the agriculture of Scotland. Edinburgh: W. Blackwood and Sons.
California. (1975). The fish and wildlife resources of Anderson Marsh, Clear Lake, Lake County. [Sacramento, Calif.]: State of California, Dept. of Fish and Game.
California. (1984). Anderson Marsh project and proposed natural preserve proposed primary historic zone. Sacramento.
California. (1989). Anderson Marsh State Historic Park general plan. [Sacramento?]: State of California, the Resources Agency, Dept. of Parks and Recreation.
California. (1996). Anderson Marsh State Historic Park. Sacramento, CA: California State Parks.
Scholz, S. (1997). An interpretive trail guide to the natural features of Anderson Marsh State Historic Park. Clearlake, CA: The author.
Scavone, K. (1999). Anderson Marsh State Historic park: a walking history, prehistory, flora, and fauna tour of a California state park. [s.l.]: Bradford Creek Publishers.

Videography 
White, G., Fredrickson, D. A., Thomas, D., Fredrickson, V.-M., Levinson, B., Thomas, T., & Huffman, M. (1994). Sharing the neighborhood for 5000 years the people of the lake and the uplands. [Sacramento]: California Dept. of Transportation.
Howser, H. (2001). California's gold. #3001, Clear Lake. [Los Angeles, Calif.]: Huell Howser Productions.

Notes

External links

Anderson Marsh State Historic Park
Anderson Marsh Interpretive Association
Undated photo of oak tree at Anderson Marsh
Lake County Archaeology Website (Anderson Marsh page)

1982 establishments in California
Archaeological sites in California
California State Historic Parks
Grasslands of California
Historic house museums in California
History of Lake County, California
Marshes of California
Museums in Lake County, California
Native American history of California
Nature reserves in California
Parks in Lake County, California
Pre-Columbian archaeological sites
Protected areas established in 1982
Landforms of Lake County, California